The Cathedral of Saints Peter and Paul is a Roman Catholic cathedral in the Cathedral Square neighborhood of Providence, Rhode Island, United States. It is the mother church of the Diocese of Providence. The Neo-Romanesque church was designed in 1873 by Patrick Keely and added to the National Register of Historic Places in 1975.

History 
On November 4, 1838, the first Mass was celebrated at a small church dedicated to Sts. Peter and Paul. Within the next five years, the population of Catholics continued to grow and flourish. In 1844, a new diocese was formed with its see at Hartford, Connecticut. Its bishop, William Tyler, elected to reside in Providence, as the majority of Catholics lived there. As the number of Catholics in the region continued to grow, the Sts. Peter and Paul Church building could not accommodate the increasing numbers of Irish Catholic immigrants.

By 1872, the Catholic population in the diocese grew to 200,000. Bishop Francis Patrick McFarland expressed interest in creating a new and larger cathedral but was unable to gain support within the diocese. Upon McFarland's request in 1871, for a reduced area to serve due to failing health, Pope Pius IX established the Diocese of Providence that encompassed Rhode Island, southeastern Massachusetts and Martha's Vineyard. In April 1872, Father Thomas Francis Hendricken became the first bishop of the new Diocese of Providence. The new diocese, at the time of its inception, recorded a Catholic population of 125,000; forty-three churches; fifty-three priests; six academies; nine parish schools with 4,225 students and one orphan asylum.

Just as his predecessor, Bishop Hendricken was also in favor of building a new cathedral church to replace the current decrepit and inadequate structure. However, before any construction could begin, the parish had to erase a $16,000 debt. Bishop Hendricken worked tirelessly to get the cathedral built and in 1872, he was able to retire the debt and begin preliminary construction planning.

In 1873, Patrick Keely was selected to draw the plans for one of the finest churches in the country. The following year, work on the foundation of a temporary church began when Bishop Hendricken signed a contract for the construction at a cost of $18,950. The old rectory was demolished and a new one built at the corner of Fenner and Pond Streets where it still stands. 

The cornerstone of the current cathedral was laid in 1878. Bishop Hendricken set aside $10,000 each year toward the building of the new structure. He also mounted a series of fundraising campaigns to keep construction going as he would only permit work to proceed if money was available. By 1882, the roof was completed and work began on the interior. However, that year Bishop Hendricken's health began to fail. He died before the cathedral was completed and his funeral Mass was the first to be celebrated in the unfinished cathedral in 1886. At the time of his death, construction costs totaled $300,000. On June 30, 1889, more than a decade after construction began, the completed cathedral was finally consecrated by Bishop Matthew Harkins. After nearly 80 years of use the cathedral underwent a major renovation beginning in 1968. Diocesan leaders intended to complete work in time for the 100th Anniversary of the founding of the diocese in 1972. The work was initiated by Bishop Russell J. McVinney, the 5th Bishop of Providence; however, like his predecessor, Bishop McVinney did not live to see the completion of the newly renovated cathedral as he died in August 1971.

In 2006, the basement of the cathedral which holds the church hall was renovated to accommodate parish gatherings and diocesan functions. The basement crypt was dismantled and a new stone tomb was laid in the upper church as a final resting place for Bishop Hendricken. Church leaders believed that Bishop Hendricken deserved a more prominent place in the building, as the cathedral is considered his legacy. The other bishops buried in the crypt were moved to a cemetery in nearby Cranston.

Notable Masses
The cathedral's first funeral Mass was held on June 16, 1886, before the structure was even completed. Providence's Bishop Thomas Francis Hendricken had been instrumental in raising support and funds for the cathedral's construction, even as his own health was failing. Hendricken died before he could see the project to completion.

On September 8, 1947, Knut Ansgar Nelson, a Benedictine monk from Portsmouth Priory who had been named the coadjutor Vicar Apostolic of Sweden, was consecrated as a bishop by Amleto Giovanni Cicognani, Apostolic Delegate to the United States.

On September 17, 2001, a memorial Mass was celebrated for Rhode Island native David Angell and his wife Lynn Edwards Angell who were passengers on American Airlines Flight 11 when it was flown into the North Tower of the World Trade Center on September 11, 2001. David Angell was a television writer and producer best known for his work on Cheers, Wings and Frasier. The Mass was celebrated by his older brother, the Most Rev. Kenneth Angell, Bishop of Burlington, VT.

A funeral Mass for former Providence mayor Buddy Cianci was held the morning of February 8, 2016, presided over by Roman Catholic Bishop Thomas Joseph Tobin.

Interior 

The cathedral's interior is decorated in a Gothic revival style and bears close resemblance to Holy Name Cathedral, the seat of the Archdiocese of Chicago. The brownstone exterior is remarkably similar to the original Cathedral of St. Joseph in Hartford, CT, finished in 1889 (which burned in 1956). Famed 19th century church architect. Patrick Keely designed all three buildings [along with hundreds of others throughout the United States and Canada).

The tabernacle was cast in bronze by X. Corberro and Sons of Barcelona, Spain. The small finial ornament atop the tabernacle took some 58 hours to complete. The main altar is built of Verde Issoire, a green marble quarried in the French Alps. Green marble serves as decorative wainscoting along the walls and comprises the interior columns along the nave. The nave and transepts are capped by a ceiling of gothic vaulting and ribs of carved wood with the areas between the ribs painted in various scenes. Stained glass windows feature scenes from both the New and Old Testaments and are fashioned from antique Munich Glass as are the west rose window, east rose window and great circular window. The windows were created in the studios of the Tyrolese Art Glass Company of Innsbruck, Austria. A large granite sarcophagus rests in the west transept, containing the remains of Bishop Thomas Francis Hendricken, first Bishop of Providence.

Exterior 
The building is constructed of Connecticut Brownstone and is one of the more prominent pieces of architecture in the city of Providence. There are two  towers which contain four church bells representative of the Four Evangelists: Matthew, Mark, Luke and John. They were cast in a Dutch foundry and were dedicated in 1968 by the late Bishop McVinney.

Cathedral Square

Cathedral Square is a paved open public space in front of the cathedral. Between 1878 and World War II, the square was a bustling civic center of downtown Providence. Shops and businesses lined the area, and church crowds numbered in the hundreds. After the war, this center of civic life dwindled as people moved to the suburbs.

In the late 1960s, the City of Providence hired up-and-coming architect I. M. Pei to redesign Cathedral Square as part of an ambitious larger plan to redesign downtown. Pei's new plaza, modeled after the Greek Agora marketplaces, opened in 1972. Unfortunately, the city ran out of money before Pei's vision could be completed. Also, recent construction of a low-income housing complex and Interstate 95 had changed the neighborhood's character permanently. In 1974, The Providence Evening Bulletin called the new plaza a 'conspicuous failure.' By 2016, media reports characterized the plaza as a neglected, little-visited "hidden gem".

Doyle statue

A statue of Providence mayor Thomas A. Doyle was erected in Cathedral Square in 1889, and removed to the corner of Broad and Chestnut Street in 1967.

Organ 
The organ was built by the Casavant Frères company of Saint-Hyacinthe, Quebec, and was completed in July 1971. Designed by renowned American organ builder Lawrence Phelps, Casavant's Opus 3145 was installed in the ecclesiastical North (compass East) Transept at a cost of $217,500. It consists of four 56-key manuals, a 32-key pedalboard, 74 stops and 126 ranks. There are 6,616 pipes ranging from 6 inches to 32 feet in length. This is one of the largest mechanical action organs in North America and one of the largest ever built by Casavant Frères.

Gallery

See also
List of Catholic cathedrals in the United States
List of cathedrals in the United States
National Register of Historic Places listings in Providence, Rhode Island

References

Further reading

External links
 Official Cathedral Site
 Roman Catholic Diocese of Providence Official Site
 Official site of the Holy See
 Panoramic view of the Cathedral's interior
 Photo of Cathedral Square ca. 1916 on Flickr

Churches on the National Register of Historic Places in Rhode Island
Peter and Paul, Cathedral of
Churches in the Roman Catholic Diocese of Providence
Patrick Keely buildings
Churches in Providence, Rhode Island
Roman Catholic churches completed in 1878
1878 establishments in Rhode Island
National Register of Historic Places in Providence, Rhode Island
Cathedrals in Rhode Island
19th-century Roman Catholic church buildings in the United States